Thorold is a city in Ontario, Canada, located on the Niagara Escarpment. It is also the seat of the Regional Municipality of Niagara. The Welland Canal passes through the city, featuring lock 7 and the Twin Flight Locks.

History
The first survey of Thorold, or Township 9 as it was known then, occurred in 1788. The earliest communities in what is now Thorold emerged at Beaverdams, DeCew Falls and St. Johns but, after the opening of the First Welland Canal in 1829, they were superseded by the new canal villages of Thorold, Allanburg and Port Robinson.

In 1846, the community had a population of about 1,000 and there were three churches or chapels and a post office. Various types of tradesmen worked here. Industry included two grist mills, a cement mill, a brewery and three wagon makers. There were seven taverns. 
 
Thorold, located on the brow of the Niagara Escarpment, soon became dominant and was incorporated as a village in 1850 and as a town in 1870. When the Regional Municipality of Niagara was formed in 1970, the Town of Thorold expanded to include the former Thorold Township. In 1975, the town became incorporated as the City of Thorold.

Thorold is also the location of the War of 1812 battle site, Beaverdams, where, on June 25, 1813, Colonel Charles Boerstler and his American troops were defeated by the British regulars and Caughnawaga Mohawks.

Geography
The city includes the neighbourhoods of Allanburg, Beaverdams, Confederation Heights, Port Robinson, St. Johns, Rolling Meadows, Thorold South and Turner's Corners.

St. Johns was one of the first areas in the interior of Niagara Peninsula to be settled by Europeans. The first Europeans settled in the area about 1792, when a sawmill was built on St. Johns Creek, a tributary of the Twelve Mile Creek. It was one of only two mills in Niagara at the time. In 1804, St. Johns became home to the first free school in Upper Canada, housed in a single-room, wooden schoolhouse. By the time a post office was established in 1831, the community included a woollen factory, a tannery, a foundry, stores, and a number of mills. Eventually, the hydro power offered by the site became less of a commodity. As industry in surrounding towns grew, St. Johns' affluence declined.

Demographics 

Arts and culture
Thorold is home to several festivals and annual events. Included are:
 Mountain Top Ceremony - Held at the Lock 7 Viewing Complex, this annual celebration marks the opening of the Welland Canal shipping season with the arrival of the first ship of the year through Lock 3. Usually held in late March.
 The Canal Bank Shuffle - A three-day annual festival of music and dance in the downtown core.  Features blues musicians.
 The Can-View 4 was a drive-in theatre complex located near Highway 20.
 The Thorold Reed Band is Canada's oldest, continually running band of any kind. Established in 1851, this community band's main stage is the bandstand at Battle of Beaverdams Park. In addition to their summer concert series, TRB also performs off-season at Knox Presbyterian Church.

Attractions

Trails
The Welland Canal Parkway Trail is a paved recreational path beginning in St. Catharines at Lake Ontario and ending at Lake Erie in Port Colborne. Three sections of the trail are located within Thorold, which are:
 Section Four: Glendale Avenue to Beaverdams Road, Thorold
 Section Five: Beaverdams Road to Allanburg, Thorold
 Section Six: Allanburg to Port Robinson, Thorold

The trail follows the Welland Canal, and passes next to the Thorold Lock 7 Viewing Complex.

Parks
Officially opened in 2002, the Mel Swart Lake Gibson Conservation Park is a 29-acre waterfront park located on Lake Gibson.  There are trails winding through the park as well as a main path along the perimeter. One of the main features of the park is the suspended boardwalk that runs along the shore of the lake. The Mel Swart - Lake Gibson Conservation Park is part of the Niagara Greenbelt.

Short Hills Provincial Park is partially located in the City of Thorold.

Historical sites

DeCew House
On DeCew Road, DeCou House was constructed in the late 18th century as a home for British Captain John B. DeCou. It served as the area's British headquarters during the War of 1812. On June 22, 1813, Laura Secord journeyed from Queenston to DeCew House to warn Lieutenant James FitzGibbon of an impending American attack. FitzGibbon and his men were able to capture the American force and help turn the tide of the war. The house was destroyed by fire in 1950 but the site is commemorated by the rebuilt foundation and a plaque.

The Old Fire Hall
At 12 Albert Street West, was constructed next to the Second Welland Canal in 1878. This building once housed Thorold's police force and, to this day, contains a jail with 2 small cells and 1 larger in the basement. For many years, the fire bell tolled for the town's strictly enforced nine o'clock curfew. The Old Firehall was designed by the architect John Latshaw and built for $2,483. It has a combination bell tower and hose tower, yellow and red brickwork, semi-circular wood windows, and a circular wood window in the gable end at the tower. Decorative yellow brick arches frame each window. The bell which hung in its tower remained in use until 1964, when the fire department moved into its new hall on nearby Towpath Street. In 1967 the old bell was installed outside the new firehall. The "Old Hall" was used as the Thorold YMCA for several years thereafter. There are 3 holding cells in the basement. 2 are small and another larger one under the west side of the building.

Chestnut Hall
At 14 Ormond Street North, is a carefully restored 1862 building that was once home to John McDonagh, a lumber merchant and mayor of the Town of Thorold from 1881–1884.

St. Johns School House
On Hollow Road, is a single-room wooden school house located in the west portion of Thorold.  Opening in 1804, it was the first free school in Upper Canada. The first teacher at the school was Samuel Birdsall. The enrolment in 1826 was recorded as 29 students. The building was fully restored in 1974.

Maplehurst
At 14 Saint David's Road West, is a Thorold landmark and the former home of Jacob Keefer. The mansion sits on the highest rise in the city offering a commanding view of the community below. Built by Hugh Keefer in 1885, this red stone structure with elaborate gables and dormers has been variously used in the past as a residence, a hospital, and a private nursing home. Maplehurst was recently restored to its original condition and is currently known as the Keefer Mansion, a 10-room inn.

Welland Mills
At 20 Pine Street North, was constructed in 1846 on the bank of the second Welland Canal by Jacob Keefer and, at that time, it contained the largest watermill in Canada. The Keefers were entrepreneurs and are considered one of Thorold's founding families. At its height, the mill was capable of manufacturing 300 barrels (89 tonnes) of flour per day and storing 70,000 bushels (1,900 tonnes) of wheat and 5,000 barrels (440 tonnes) of flour. Today, the Welland Mills building has been restored offering commercial space on the ground floor and residential apartments above.

Beaverdams Methodist Church and Cemetery
On Marlatt's Road, was constructed in 1832. Beaverdams Church is the oldest Methodist Church still standing in Ontario. The first minister to preach in the chapel was Reverend Egerton Ryerson, who is largely responsible for founding the province of Ontario's education system.

Soldiers' Monument
A war memorial monument that commemorates World War I, World War II and the Korean War. Located in Memorial Park, at the corner of Albert and Chapel streets, it was unveiled on Sunday, October 30, 1921 and was erected by the citizens of Thorold to: "Honour the Memory of the Men of Thorold, who gave their lives for the cause of freedom in the great war, and in grateful remembrance of those who shared its dangers."

The Old Public Library
At 1 Ormond Street South, is one of 156 Carnegie libraries to have been funded in Canada. The building, designed by architect A. E. Nicholson, was opened in 1912. The library moved from here to its present home in Chestnut Hall in 1983. The building now serves as office space.

Sports

Thorold Blackhawks
The Thorold Blackhawks, founded in 1963, are a Junior 'B' hockey team in the Greater Ontario Junior Hockey League. The Blackhawks were Golden Horseshoe Junior Hockey League Champions in 2001, 2003, 2004, 2005 and Golden Horseshoe Conference Champions in 2008. In 2005, the team went on to capture the Sutherland Cup as the best Junior 'B' team in Ontario. Notable former players include Nathan Horton, Dwayne Roloson, Conor Timmins and Owen Nolan. The Blackhawks home rink is the Thorold Community Arena in downtown Thorold. The team colours are black, white and red.

Infrastructure

Transportation 
The Thorold Tunnel is an underwater vehicular tunnel, built between 1965 and 1967, which allows Highway 58 to cross the Welland Canal without interrupting shipping. Approximately 24,300 vehicles pass through the tunnel daily.

Niagara Detention Centre 
Thorold is home to the Niagara Detention Centre, a 260-person capacity maximum-security prison. It generally serves people on remand, offenders sentenced to short terms (60 days or less), and offenders awaiting transfer to larger federal or provincial facilities. It is located between the neighbourhoods of Thorold South and Allanburg.

Notable people
Owen Nolan, professional hockey player
Joey Martin (ice hockey), professional hockey player
Sean Bentivoglio, professional hockey player
Conor Timmins, professional hockey player

Gallery

See also
List of townships in Ontario
Morningstar Mill
2022 Canada Summer Games

References

External links

 
Cities in Ontario
Lower-tier municipalities in Ontario